Tubospirina is an extinct genus of fossil sea snails, marine gastropod mollusks in the family Craspedostomatidae. These snails were parasitic-carnivores. They lived in the Silurian Period, Pridoli Age (from 418.7 ± 1.5 to 416 ± 2.8 mya).

Etymology
The genus name Tubospirina combines the Latin word tubus, meaning "tube" and the genus name Spirina.

Description
The genus Tubospirina is very similar to the genus Spirina, but it can be distinguished by the dextrally coiled shell with a flatly arched upper side. The shells are large, with a wide aperture and a characteristic ornamentation of rounded costae and interspaces. This new genus has been tentatively placed close to the genus Spirina in the family Craspedostomatidae.

Species
 Tubospirina tubicina - Previously known as Spirina tubicina Perner, 1903 - recombined as Tubospirina tubicina according to J. Frýda in 1998.

Distribution
This genus has been found in the Silurian of the Czech Republic.

References

External links
 Paleobiology Database

Craspedostomatidae